The Tioga River is a tributary of the Chemung River, approximately  long, in northern Pennsylvania and western New York in the United States. It drains a region of ridges in the northern Allegheny Plateau in the watershed of the Susquehanna River. It is a Northern flowing river

In the 19th century, trees logged in the Tioga Valley were extensively used in shipbuilding. Logs were floated up the Tioga to the Chemung and down to the Susquehanna River and on to the Chesapeake Bay and the shipyards of Baltimore.

Course

The Tioga River rises in the mountains of western Bradford County and flows initially southwest into Tioga County, passing through Tioga State Forest. In southern Tioga County it turns north, cutting gaps in four separate ridges while flowing past Blossburg and Mansfield, then through Tioga Reservoir. North of Tioga it receives Crooked Creek from the west, then crosses into Steuben County, New York, near Lawrenceville, Pennsylvania. It joins the Cohocton River at Painted Post, just west of Corning, to form the Chemung River, a tributary of the Susquehanna.

Tioga Reservoir
The Tioga River has one major impoundment, the Tioga Reservoir, formed by a dam just before the borough of Tioga, Pennsylvania. Built together with the adjoining Hammond Dam and Hammond Lake (on Crooked Creek), the total project cost $200 million.

The dam projects were initially authorized by the United States Congress in the Flood Control Act of 3 July 1958 (Public Law 85-500). Construction was begun in the aftermath of the devastating floods caused by Hurricane Agnes in June 1972, which resulted in widespread damage along the rivers.  A channel connects the two lakes so that Hammond Lake (which has greater storage capacity) may be used to store excess (flood) water from Tioga Lake.

In addition to supporting flood control on the Chemung and Susquehanna rivers, the dams are also meant to help improve water quality by decreasing the acidity of water in the Tioga River downstream of the dams; it is diluted by addition of the more neutral waters of Crooked Creek. The Tioga River's acidity is caused by acid mine drainage.

The lakes also offer recreational opportunities, including camping, boating, fishing, swimming, and hiking on area trails.

See also
List of New York rivers
List of rivers of Pennsylvania

References

External links
U.S. Geological Survey: PA stream gaging stations
Rootsweb: Tioga River history
U.S. Army Corps of Engineers page on Tioga-Hammond Lakes
History of the Hammond-Tioga Dam Project
Chesapeake Bay Program - The Tioga River Watershed
Chesapeake Bay Program - Tioga River - Canisteo River To Chemung River Watershed

Rivers of New York (state)
Rivers of Pennsylvania
Tributaries of the Chemung River
Rivers of Bradford County, Pennsylvania
Rivers of Tioga County, Pennsylvania
Rivers of Steuben County, New York
Allegheny Plateau